Jenna Stern is an American actress who appeared in the play "Skyscraper".

Stern is the daughter of actress Samantha Eggar and actor and producer Tom Stern. Her brothers are Nicolas Stern and Cameron Cash.

Stern is married to actor Brennan Brown.

Filmography

Film
 Solo 2 ore

Television

References

External links

Jenna Stern's web site

Place of birth missing (living people)
American film actresses
American television actresses
Living people
20th-century American actresses
21st-century American actresses
Year of birth missing (living people)